The Minnesota Bureau of Criminal Apprehension (BCA) is a statewide criminal investigative bureau under the Minnesota Department of Public Safety that provides expert forensic science and criminal investigation services throughout the state of Minnesota. The BCA assists local, state, tribal, and federal agencies in major criminal investigations. It is headquartered in St. Paul. The BCA's current superintendent is Drew Evans.

History

The Bureau of Criminal Apprehension (BCA) was created by the Minnesota Legislature in 1927 in order to assist police departments statewide to solve crimes and apprehend criminals, under the direction of the Minnesota Attorney General's office. The BCA gathers crime statistics to assist state and local agencies to identify criminal trends. In 1935, agents received full police power and were licensed police officers throughout the state. In 1947, the BCA Crime Lab was established in St. Paul to assist in solving of crimes via forensic science, and was one of the first DNA laboratories in the United States in 1990. Later the BCA was the first law enforcement agency in the United States to identify a suspect solely on DNA. In 1969, the agency was moved under direction of the State Attorney General's Office to the Minnesota Department of Public Safety. In 2001, the BCA opened an additional forensic laboratory in Bemidji. In 2004, the Bureau became one of four laboratories in the United States selected by the Federal Bureau of Investigation to serve as a regional mitochondrial DNA laboratory.

Divisions

Forensic Science Division provides forensic science expertise to law enforcement agencies statewide and to the FBI. This includes crime scene processing, digital and multimedia evidence collection, DNA collection and processing, forensic firearm examination, fingerprint identification, Toxicology, Trace evidence, breath alcohol instrument calibration, and chemical testing.
Investigative Division provides criminal investigative assistance to law enforcement agencies statewide. BCA agents and analysts are positioned in two regional offices in St. Paul and Bemidji, along with 11 field offices located in Alexandria, Brainerd, Duluth, Grand Rapids, Mankato, Marshall, Moorhead, Rochester, Roseau, St. Cloud and Willmar. Services include crime scene investigations, cold case assistance, human trafficking investigations, predatory offender investigations, use-of-force and conflict investigations, and special operations. 
Minnesota Justice Information Services (MNJIS), manages information between sources of criminal justice data for law enforcement agencies and criminal investigation agencies to help solve crimes via statistics and analysis.
Administrative Services provides training to law enforcement and investigation agencies to assist in crime scene investigation and investigation of crimes. In addition, assists in missing persons and the State's Amber alert system.

See also
Forensic science
DNA profiling
Crime scene
Forensic data analysis
Expert witness
Minnesota State Patrol
Minnesota Department of Public Safety
Federal Bureau of Investigation

References

External links
 Minnesota Bureau of Criminal Apprehension
 Minnesota Department of Public Safety

State law enforcement agencies of Minnesota
State Bureaus of Investigation
1927 establishments in Minnesota
Government agencies established in 1927